Ghasem Rezaei (born 18 August 1985) is an Iranian former Greco-Roman wrestler. He was an Olympic gold and bronze medalist and two-time Asian Champion. His nickname is Tiger of Amol.

Career
Rezaei first success at the international level was 2007 when he won bronze in the 2007 World Wrestling Championships. However, his run at the top of the wrestling world was be short-lived. Though he represented Iran in the 2008 Olympics, he suffered early defeat in the first round. Rezaei two success won the gold medal at the 2007 Asian Wrestling Championships and 2008 Asian Wrestling Championships. In 2009, Rezaei found himself unable to compete due to injury.

At the 2011 Greco-Roman World Championship, Rezaei was scheduled to face Israeli Robert Avanesyan in the first round. Rather than face the Israeli, Rezaei failed to appear and thus lost the match by forfeit to the Israeli, was eliminated from the tournament, and gave the Israeli free passage into the Round of 16.

In the years leading up to the 2012 games, Rezaei was unable to recapture his status as Iran's top Greco-Roman wrestler at 96 kilograms. In 2012 Rezaei won the Olympic berth for his country. Rezaei in final defeated Rustam Totrov 2–0, 1–0 in the final at the Excel Center in London on Tuesday.
Rezaei beat Turkey Cenk Ildem in his first match, before he beat Artur Aleksanyan 2–0, 1–0 in the quarter-finals. Rezaei defeated Yunior Estrada also 2–0, 1–0 in the semi-finals. He won the gold medal in the men's 96 kg Greco-Roman at the 2012 London Olympics in London.
Ghasem Rezaei captured gold medal at 2015 International Greco-Roman wrestling tournament, Pytlasinski in Poland. Rezaei in 2015 World Championship won a silver medal at the Greco-Roman 2015. He with Elis Guri 3–0 in the semi-finals, and qualified for the final bout, where he conceded a 3–0 defeat to Artur Aleksanyan and won the silver. Rezaei ended up in Bronze in Greco-Roman wrestling competitions in the men's 96 kg Greco-Roman at the 2016 Summer Olympics in Rio. Rezaei in his last Olympic game stood in front of Carl Fredrik Schön. Schön went up 4–0 after a takedown and gut wrench in the first period. The Iranian in the second period scored with back-to-back gut wrenches to make the score 4–4 and ultimately give him the victory on criteria.

See also
Boycotts of Israel in individual sports

References

External links
 

1985 births
Living people
People from Amol
Iranian male sport wrestlers
Olympic wrestlers of Iran
Wrestlers at the 2008 Summer Olympics
Wrestlers at the 2012 Summer Olympics
Wrestlers at the 2016 Summer Olympics
Olympic gold medalists for Iran
Olympic bronze medalists for Iran
Olympic medalists in wrestling
Medalists at the 2012 Summer Olympics
Medalists at the 2016 Summer Olympics
World Wrestling Championships medalists
Asian Wrestling Championships medalists
Sportspeople from Mazandaran province
20th-century Iranian people
21st-century Iranian people